The following is a list of notable events and releases that occurred in 2011 in mainland European music.

Events

January
17 – The 2011 Grammis Awards take place in Sweden. Robyn walks away as the big winner of the night receiving awards in four categories: Best Female Artist; Best Composer; Best Album for Body Talk; and Best Song for Dancing on My Own.
30 – The Netherlands national final for the Eurovision Song Contest was held (Nationaal Songfestival). The song Je vecht nooit alleen (You will never fight alone) is chosen for Dutch band 3JS.

February
13 – Melissa Horn begins a tour of Denmark
18 – Slovakian national broadcaster Slovenská televízia announces that girl-group TWiiNS will represent the country at the 56th annual Eurovision Song Contest with the song I'm Still Alive.
18 – Germany decide upon the song Taken by a Stranger in the final of Unser Song für Deutschland to represent the country at the Eurovision Song Contest. Lena Meyer-Landrut will attempt to retain her title following Germany's win of the contest in 2010.
19 – Spain decides to send Lucía Pérez to Düsseldorf with the song Que me quiten lo bailao in the final of Destino Eurovisión.
19 – Italy decides to send Raphael Gualazzi to Düsseldorf with the song Follia d'amore in the final of the Sanremo Festival 2011.
19 – Kylie Minogue begins the European leg of her Aphrodite World Tour in Denmark, with dates following in Finland, Estonia, Latvia, Lithuania, Germany, Spain, Switzerland, Belgium, Ireland and the United Kingdom.
26 – The so-called 'Super Saturday' takes place where six nations choose their participants for the Eurovision Song Contest. Musiqq, Mika Newton, Nina, A Friend In London, Zdob şi Zdub and Getter Jaani will represent Latvia, Ukraine, Serbia, Denmark, Moldova and Estonia respectively.
28 – Roxette begins its Charm School World Tour in Kazan, Rusia, in front of 8.000 people. 55 shows are set for Europe.

May
14 – The finale of the 56th Eurovision Song Contest takes place in Düsseldorf, Germany. It is won by pop duo Ell & Nikki, representing Azerbaijan with the song "Running Scared".

Undated
A Winged Victory for the Sullen form.

Albums set to be released

January
28 – Violent Sky by Lisa Miskovsky

February
8 – Good News by Lena Meyer-Landrut
11 – Charm School by Roxette
11 – Thank God for Sending Demons by Me and My Army
14 – Love CPR by September
18 – Das wär dein Lied gewesen by Ina Müller
18 – Kick death's Ass  by Andreas Mattsson
28 – Wounded Rhymes by Lykke Li

March
16 – Unseen by The Haunted
29 – Surtur Rising by Amon Amarth

April
15 – The Unseen Empire by Scar Symmetry
25 – Bloodbath over Bloodstock by Bloodbath
27 – Satan i gatan by Veronica Maggio

May
30 – Khaos Legions by Arch Enemy

June
6 – A Dying Man's Hymn by Sky Architect
15 – Sounds of a Playground Fading by In Flames
17 – Ljubav živi by Ceca
20 – Original Me by Cascada

October
10 – Biophilia by Björk
25 – Audio, Video, Disco by Justice
25 – Mylo Xyloto by Coldplay

Unspecified date
Untitled by Agnes Carlsson
The Seven Temptations by Doda

Festivals

Exit Festival

Arcade Fire
Pulp
Jamiroquai
Portishead
Grinderman
M.I.A.
Editors
House of Pain
Santigold
Bad Religion
Kreator
Underworld
Deadmau5
Groove Armada
Magnetic Man

Metaltown Festival

System of a Down
Raubtier
Parkway Drive
Cradle of Filth
At the Gates
The Black Dahlia Murder
Graveyard
Soilwork
Ghost
Volbeat
Watain
Korn
Khoma
Cavalera Conspiracy
All That Remains
Doctor Midnight & The Mercy Cult
F.K.Ü –
Deicide
Bring Me the Horizon
Arch Enemy
Avenged Sevenfold
Anvil
Bullet
Human Desolation
Madball
Corroded

OFF Festival

Ariel Pink's Haunted Graffiti
Liars
Meshuggah
Current 93
Actress
Omar Souleyman
Gablé
Kury
Kyst

Open'er Festival

D4D
Coldplay
Paristetris
Paolo Nutini
Caribou
Fat Freddy's Drop
The Streets
Pulp
Foals
Cut Copy
Abraham Inc.
Youssou N'Dour
Primus
The Wombats
M.I.A.
Hurts

Way Out West 2011

Ariel Pink's Haunted Graffiti
The Avett Brothers
Explosions in the Sky
Fleet Foxes
The Jayhawks
Janelle Monáe
Pulp
Robyn
Twin Shadow
Thåström
Warpaint
Wiz Khalifa

Deaths
1 January – Marin Constantin, 85, Romanian composer.
4 January – Stina-Britta Melander, 86, Swedish opera singer.

See also
 2010s in music

References

Music
European